The 1957 Texas Tech Red Raiders football team represented Texas Technological College—now known as Texas Tech University—as an independent during the 1957 NCAA University Division football season. In their seventh season under head coach DeWitt Weaver, the Red Raiders compiled a 2–8 record and were outscored by opponents by a combined total of 190 to 120. The team's statistical leaders included Jerry Bell with 489 passing yards, Ronnie Rice with 426 rushing yards, and Jimmie Knox with 201 receiving yards. The team played its home games at Clifford B. and Audrey Jones Stadium.

Schedule

References

Texas Tech
Texas Tech Red Raiders football seasons
Texas Tech Red Raiders football